Chilldrin of da Ghetto is the debut and only studio album by American rap group Chilldrin of da Ghetto (COG). It was released October 12, 1999 through Hoo-Bangin' Records with distribution via Priority Records. Production was handled entirely by COG member Goldiiz, with Mack 10 serving as executive producer. The album features guest appearances from Mack 10, Soultre, MC Eiht, Juvenile, B.G., and Barbara Wilson. It peaked at number 158 on the Billboard 200, at number 24 on the Top R&B/Hip-Hop Albums, and at number 8 on the Heatseekers Albums in the United States.

The album spawned two singles: "Wild Side" and "Luv at First Sight", the latter peaked at number 67 on the Billboard Hot R&B/Hip-Hop Songs and at number 6 on the Billboard Rap Songs. Along with a single, a music video was released for the song "Wild Side" with cameo appearances by MC Eiht and Mack 10. Songs "It's Time to Roll" and "Drug Lord" were originally heard in the 1999 film Thicker than Water and were also released on the film's soundtrack.

Chilldrin of da Ghetto is composed of Quentin "Goldiiz" Brown, Prentice "Bad Seed" Brown and Datqunn "P-Child" Sawyer. The group formed on the West Side of Chicago, in the Austin neighborhood on the section known as "L-Town", which is basically an area where within a mile all the north and south streets start the letter L.

Critical reception 

Keith Farley of AllMusic - "...an intriguing hip-hop album chocked with the trio's intricate speed-raps and freestyling. The production...provides an excellent accompaniment to the raps on highlight tracks like "Intention to Kill" and "Wild Side".

The Source (11/99, p. 224) "...these three possess that country-twanged, tongue-twisting rhyming ability that has gained the Midwest its notoriety...the majority of the beats are original and provide the right amount of head nod to complement each quickened rhyme..."

Track listing

Chart history

References

External links 

1999 debut albums
Gangsta rap albums by American artists
Priority Records albums